Salyavatinae are a subfamily of the assassin bugs. They have a pan-tropical distribution with about 16 genera. They have two foretarsal segments and have a patch of fine hairs known as the fossula spongiosa on the fore and mid tibia. Many species tend to have spines on the head, pronotum, legs and abdomen. A few species have the foretibia flattened into leaf-like structures.

 Acosmetocoris 
 Alvilla 
 Araneaster 
 Elaphocranus 
 Eudima 
 Lisarda 
 Paralisarda 
 Petalocheirus 
 Platychiria 
 Rhachicephala 
 Rulandus 
 Salyavata 
 Syberna 
 Tragelaphodes 
 Tritavus 
 Valentia

References 

Insect subfamilies
Reduviidae